Sam or Samuel Cary may refer to:
 Samuel Fenton Cary (1814–1900), Ohio congressman
 Samuel Eddy Cary (1886–1961), Kansas and Colorado lawyer